Chrysoclista basiflavella is a moth of the family Agonoxenidae. It was described by Shōnen Matsumura in 1931. It is found in Japan.

References

Moths described in 1931
Agonoxeninae
Moths of Japan